A sobrado is a house building style from the Portuguese colonial era, typical in Brazil and other former Portuguese colonies. It is a form equivalent to the Anglo-American townhouse, particularly the creole townhouse in Louisiana. Featuring typically two floors with a balcony, the sobrados were the residences of urban notable people, particularly in the former colonial capital of Brazil, Salvador. They are also found in Cape Verde, particularly in São Filipe on the Fogo island, and Angola, in Luanda.

A sobrado typically consists of two or more floors and a relatively large built area. During the colonial period in Brazil these houses served as residences for slave owners in cities, heralding a sluggish beginning for urbanization in Brazil. In the previous period, an antagonism existed between the casa-grandes and the slave quarters, where the houseowners contrasted with the housekeepers who belonged to the poorer strata of society. The expression arose naturally from the houses built in the cities of Minas Gerais (especially during the Gold Cycle), usually characterized by a topography typically called mar de morros (Portuguese: "sea of hills"): the constructions were carried out from the highest level of the street, so that there was "a space" under the main floor of the building. Over time, this lower level came to be considered the ground floor, characterizing these "maisonettes".

Nowadays, this name for a house may be given to any such residence with more than one floor, and may even be applied to commercial establishments.

See also
Funco
Casa chorizo

References

Further reading
Sobrados e Mucambos [Sobrados and Mucambos] (1936)  by Gilberto Freyre
 Henrique Teixeira de Sousa, Sobrados, lojas e funcos, Claridade, Mindelo, no. 8, 1958, p. 2-8

External links

Casa-grande & Sobrados

Housing
Architecture in Portugal
Portuguese colonial architecture in Brazil
Architecture in Cape Verde
House styles